Archibald Joseph Charles Fisher (15 June 1896 – 7 November 1959) was an artist born in Dudley, England who was educated at the Royal College of Art, London who came to New Zealand to take up the post of principal of Elam Art School in 1924 and was instrumental in having Elam recognised as an integral part of the University of Auckland in 1950.

Further reading

Crippen, J. A.J.C. Fisher: His Life and Work in Home and Building Volume 27 no. 9, Feb 1965.

References

New Zealand painters
1896 births
1959 deaths
Academic staff of the University of Auckland
Alumni of the Royal College of Art
People from Dudley
English emigrants to New Zealand
20th-century British painters
British male painters
20th-century British male artists